is a fictional character from the Tekken fighting game franchise by Bandai Namco Entertainment. First introduced in the 2008 arcade game Tekken 6: Bloodline Rebellion, he became the main protagonist in the story mode of Tekken 6.

Introduced as the leader of the rebel group , Lars commands his forces against Jin Kazama in order to stop the war he started during the Tekken 6 storyline through his military group, the Mishima Zaibatsu. Wounded in the crossfire, Lars meets the robot Alisa Bosconovitch who accopanies him on a journey to find Jin. Since Tekken 6, Lars has become a recurring character in the franchise, and has appeared in the cross-over Street Fighter X Tekken and as a guest character in Naruto Shippuden: Ultimate Ninja Storm 2.

Conceived from a name idea for a Swedish character, Lars was given a moveset fitting with other strong characters in the series, to make him easy to use by newcomers to the franchise. While he became fairly popular among fans of the series, the character had a mixed reception from video game reviewers. While some critics praised his fighting style, some found his design ridiculous. Nevertheless, his inclusion in Ultimate Ninja Storm 2 was praised for fitting in the cast thanks to manga author Masashi Kishimoto's take on the character.

Creation and design
Game developer studio Namco had wanted to include a Tekken Force character to the series since Tekken 3. Lars' full name was proposed to the staff by an unknown woman from the Swedish embassy in Japan, years before Tekken 6 was developed. Tekken producer Katsuhiro Harada found it "cool" and immediately decided to use the name. Lars was finally introduced to Tekken 6 in an update titled Bloodline Rebellion. In early sketches, Lars was depicted as older than his in-game appearance, with a beard and a ponytail. Another rejected sketch featured Lars' complete Tekken Force design that covered his entire face and had a bigger cape. Unlike other new Tekken 6 characters who were based on fan input, both Lars and fellow newcomer Alisa Bosconovitch were created using a different approach, focusing on their importance to the game's story. As a result, in the arcade version of Tekken 6, most of Lars' identity was kept a mystery, leaving it to the console versions' Scenario Campaign mode to explain his role in the series, with Harada teasing about his potential attack of Jin Kazama's forces. In response to claims that the story of Tekken was complicated, Harada denied as he saw it as a "simple" struggle between members from the Mishima family and how multiple characters are dragged into this. Lars was designed with the idea of him not being a corrupted protagonist, contrasting Jin Kazama and Kazuya Mishima's stories. His original outfit symbolizes multiple heroes in fiction with his armor being derived from Dragon Balls Goku and Marvel Comics's Thor's designs. Michael Murray explained the Tekken team created Lars in order to appeal to the Nordic audiences based on the series popularity in that region.

As with several other characters from Tekken 6, Lars was given an alternate outfit designed by a manga artist, with Lars' being done by Masashi Kishimoto, author of the manga Naruto. In redesigning Lars, Kishimoto removed his Tekken Force outfit and gave him one made of a soft rubber material, marked with a lion figure on his right arm. He also made multiple cuts for the belt on the back, so that Lars' kicking techniques would be possible. Also, on the outfit's back are the numbers for Sweden's telephone country code: "46". In the Wii U version of Tekken Tag Tournament 2, Lars has an extra costume based on Link from Nintendo's The Legend of Zelda series. For Tekken 7, Lars was given another look by Akira Nishitani, aka Nin-Nin. After multiple drafts that gave Lars different colors and accessories, Nin-Nin made one which retains elements from the Tekken Force design, while adding a torn red cape. For Street Fighter X Tekken, Lars retains his Tekken 6 outfit, but is also given an alternate ninja outfit.

In October 2017, as part of a collaboration between Tekkens staff and New Japan Pro-Wrestling, it was revealed that Lars would be getting a new costume in Tekken 7, inspired by professional wrestler Hiroshi Tanahashi. When using this costume, Lars' theme changes to "LOVE&ENERGY" by Yonosuke Kitamura, and he is given a new move known as "Sling Blade". The costume was released in Japanese arcades on November 18, 2017, while the console versions obtained it as free downloadable content on May 31, 2018. After the collaboration, Tanahashi praised the resulting change in Lars' design, as well as the incorporation of his own moves.

Across all his appearances, Lars has been voiced by Junichi Suwabe, including Street Fighter X Tekken, where he is also voiced by Zach Hanks in the English dub. Suwabe enjoyed voicing the character and expected his players to enjoy him in Tekken 7. He also commented about the Tekken 7 trailer where Lars and Noctis interact together.

Gameplay
Lars' gameplay style was made to fit with those of older characters in the series. The developers called him "quick and agile" based on his varied moves, which were intend to give players multiple strategic possibilities and prevent them from being cornered against a wall. They also intended that Lars be easy to use by newcomers, making his moves "unpredictable for opponents". Designer Yuichi Yonemori mentioned that Lars' fighting style is effective for countering aggressive players, due to his speed, which allow players to avoid taking too much damage in combat.

GameSpy referred to him as one of the most "flexible" fighters but stated some of his combos were hard to execute. When Tekken 6 was first released, Namco Bandai received several complaints from fans about Lars being too powerful. Harada said that Lars' strength was intentional, and argued that every time a new character is introduced to the franchise, he might be perceived as stronger, as had happened with Akuma, who appears as a guest character in Tekken 7. Several of Lars' moves involve electricity, with one of his most powerful ones being named after , the Greek thunder god. For Capcom's crossover game Street Fighter X Tekken, the official guide encouraged players to use Lars' strong kicks in order to cancel his enemies' special attacks and get close to the rival. In Ninja Storm 2, Lars is a close-up fighter, also featuring electricity-based moves in contrast to other characters who rely on projectile techniques.

Harada said he thought Lars remained the strongest character to use in fighting tournaments, though others claim Steve Fox and the Mishimas – Jin, Kazuya and Heihachi – were stronger. For Tekken Tag Tournament 2, Harada revealed that Lars had been rebalanced from Tekken 6 in order to better fit with the cast of this spinoff. A renowned Tekken player known as "JDCR" listed Lars as third tier in the Tag Tournament 2 ranks, a spot he shared with Jin, both being surpassed by Heihachi Mishima, Devil Jin and Kazuya Mishima. JDCR commented that Lars felt easy to use for newcomers, to the point of considering him "dangerous". On his Twitter account, Harada has often been asked by gamers to increase Lars' strength, which resulted in an internet meme titled "Buff Lars"; Harada refused to do it. According to Tekken 7 visual design manager Kousuke Waki, Lars was one of the characters they updated, but at the same time they saved some of the changes for the "Fated Retribution" update, in order to make the transition to Tekken 7 more welcoming for returning Tekken 6 players. On Fated Retribution, several of Lars' techniques were patched to increase the damage they cause. Famitsu commented on Lars' moves from Tekken 7, specifically referring to his great speed and his techniques, which provide him with good defensive and counterattacking options.

Theme song
During the production of Tekken 7, Harada was impressed by the Swedish rock band BatAAr, and felt the game could benefit from their songs. The group originally met Harada during a Twitter conversation when one of the band members asked him where he could buy a Tekken action figure in Tokyo. Harada invited the group to dine with him and presented them with his idea. As Lars is half-Swedish, he asked the band to compose the character's theme song, which he hoped fans of the franchise would look forward to hearing when playing the character. The group then went to Japanese arcades to play Tekken 7 as Lars while listening to their own music, which they found fitting. Honored by the proposal, the band said Harada had given them complete freedom as long as the song included Swedish lyrics to fit Lars' nationality. Band member Patrik, responsible for writing the lyrics, made extensive research about Lars' role in the Tekken series, as well as fan theories about him, in an attempt to understand Lars' characterization in Tekken 7 and make the lyrics fit. BatAAr's theme song for Lars was ultimately titled "Vrede" (Swedish for "Wrath"), and included in both a CD single as well as the original soundtrack of Tekken 7. The band took a liking to Lars to the point where all the band members played Tekken 7s tournament mode as him, singing "Vrede" during pauses.

Appearances

In the Tekken series
Lars is the illegitimate son of Heihachi Mishima, who sired him as an experiment to see if he could pass on the powerful Devil Gene. Following Jin Kazama's victory at the King of Iron Fist Tournament in Tekken 5, the Mishima Zaibatsu corporation declares a world war. G Corporation rises in opposition, which results in mass casualties. During the battles, many members of the Tekken Force defect and Lars leads the coup d'état, forming the rebel force Yggdrasil, where he is the leader of the alpha squad.

In the campaign mode in the console versions of Tekken 6, Lars is the central character. After the infiltration of a Mishima Zaibatsu-run laboratory goes awry, he loses his memory and begins to seek out his true purpose. Joined by a robot named Alisa Bosconovitch, Lars travels the world trying to find his own identity. Lars' memory is restored upon encountering his father Heihachi Mishima, at which point he also rediscovers his purpose: to stop Jin and prevent both Kazuya and Heihachi from taking over Zaibatsu. He resumes his role as the leader of Yggdrasil and infiltrates G Corporation, eventually reaching the Mishima Zaibatsu headquarters himself and encountering his half-nephew, Jin. Before he can fight Jin, his half-nephew reveals that Alisa was his spy all along and orders her to fight Lars. Teaming with United Nation's agent Raven, Lars pursues a fleeing Jin into the desert, where he intends to awaken the ancient demon Azazel. At Azazel's Temple, Raven and Lars defeat the latter's half-brother Kazuya Mishima and the newly-awoken Azazel inside the temple, then encounter Alisa and Jin again. Lars disables Alisa and engages Jin in battle. As Jin lost to Lars, he explains his main reason to start a war against the world is to lure out Azazel and kill him, believing him to be the source of the cursed Devil Gene. Jin destroys Azazel, seemingly at the cost of his own life. Lars then brings the disabled Alisa to his partner and adoptive brother Lee Chaolan, who offers to restore her. After leaving Alisa with Lee and parting ways with Raven, Lars gets a call summoning him for a new mission, worrying about the fate of the Devil Gene.

In the story mode of Tekken 7, after Raven's U.N. team lost Jin's unconscious body from their custody, he finds Jin in a Middle East market and rescues him from the pursuing U.N. army. He then reunites with a restored Alisa and Lee, but the three are attacked by the Tekken Forces, who in turn are attacked by Lars' Yggdrasil forces in an attempt to stop them from targeting Jin. He saves Jin's life again, this time from a recruited journalist who intended to avenge his family whose deaths he blamed on Jin. Eventually, Lars realizes that Jin was right about the Devil Gene when he saw Kazuya in his devil form while fighting Akuma. After seeing Kazuya kill Heihachi, Lars reveals that the reason for him saving Jin was that his half-nephew has always been humanity's last hope to restore world peace, and Kazuya is the only one left who needs to be killed, to which Jin agrees. Additionally, Lars appears in a Tekken 7 trailer recruiting guest character Noctis Lucis Caelum from Final Fantasy XV for an unknown mission. The reason for both Lars and Noctis being friends is that one of Noctis' moves was based on Lars'.

Other Tekken media
Lars' role in Tekken 6 is also briefly shown in the manga Tekken Comic, and the novel Tekken: The Dark History of Mishima;. the novel is set before the game where Lars was still working for Jin's zaibatsu before he started the global chaos. Lars protects a comatose Jin from enemies most notably Kazuya. After recovering, Jin interrupts the battle between Lars and Kazuya. While Jin defeats Kazuya, Lars defeats Heihachi. Seeing Lars' victory, Jin wonders if Lars is also a Mishima and the two leave.

Although Lars does not appear in the film Tekken: Blood Vengeance Namco had plan to originally had the plot of the movie inspired by the first scene of the Scenario Campaign where Lars leads Yggdrasil in an attack against the Mishima Zaibatsu. While writer Dai Satō believed such idea was faithful to the franchise, he revised it in order to write a new story that would attract more newcomers to the movie. In retrospect, Satō was shocked when learning Lars was Heihahchi's son, comparing it to Masami Kurumada's manga Saint Seiya which uses a similar plot twist involving a man like Heihachi, Mitsumasa Kido, having several offsprings secretly.

Lars also appears in the spinoff games Tekken Tag Tournament 2, Tekken 3D: Prime Edition, and Tekken Revolution. While none of these games have a story, Lars' ending in Tag Tournament 2 features a dream sequence where he is at a meal with all of his relatives, but fails to eat anything.

Other appearances

Outside the Tekken franchise, Lars is also featured as a playable character in the fighting game Naruto Shippuden: Ultimate Ninja Storm 2, featuring his alternate Tekken 6 costume designed by Naruto creator Masashi Kishimoto. He also appears as a playable downloadable content character in the crossover game Street Fighter X Tekken, with his official tag partner, Alisa. In the game's story mode, the duo join forces to destroy Pandora's Box, and thus stop the wars between factions that are fighting for it. In the 2013 update to the game, Lars was among the characters that were modified extensively. Lars also appeared in CyberConnect2's tactical role-playing game Full Bokko Heroes X in his Tekken 7 design, but with a super deformed look.

Lars' inclusion in Naruto Shippuden: Ultimate Ninja Storm 2 was initially conceived of by CyberConnect2 CEO Hiroshi Matsuyama. In 2009, Matsuyama read in a Weekly Shōnen Jump magazine that Lars' third costume had been designed by Kishimoto and thought he should be included in Ultimate Ninja Storm 2. As a result, Matsuyama approached Tekken 6 producer Suguru Sasaki and his team and asked them to include Lars in the game using Kishimoto's outfit. Once this was approved, the Tekken staff started assisting CyberConnect2 to adjust Lars' moves to fit the other characters in the Naruto game. When the work was concluded, Matsuyama was surprised at how well Lars fitted in with the game's cast.

Lars' appearance from Tekken 7 was also used as downloadable content for the fighting game Virtua Fighter 5.

Reception

Critical reception to Lars has been mixed. Positive responses focused on his "badass nature", noted by IGN in reaction to his moveset consisting mostly of punches aimed at his opponent's face. The reviewer also noted that the accessories that players can unlock for Lars were designed to make him more likable, reinforcing how appealing his character becomes across the game. Meristation referred to him as one of the most charismatic fighters presented in the franchise to the point of being one of his favorites. GamesRadar highly praised Lars' heroic characterization in contrast with the antagonists in Tekken like Jin and Kazuya. Because of Lars' moves, writers have often recommended that beginner players of Tekken 7 play as him with Vandal comparing him with Jin as well as Ryu from the Street Fighter series, due to how easy to use he is. In a 2012 official fan poll by Bandai Namco, Lars was one of the most requested Tekken characters for inclusion in Tekken X Street Fighter, receiving 9755 (11.05%) of 88,280 votes. SNK character designer Falcoon said he enjoyed both his gameplay style due to the combos he can perform as well as his alternate civil clothing, most notably due to his gloves. At the MCM London Comic Con 2009, a Tekken 6 player named Eliot Smith-Walters was awarded the Guinness World Record for the longest winning streak in Tekken 6, by winning 68 consecutive matches, playing mainly Lars. The character has also been popular with cosplayers; most notably, in 2012 a Brazilian duo won an award at the 2012 World Cosplay Summit for cosplaying as Lars and Alisa.

Gavin Jasper of Den of Geek focused on how, despite his family  always betraying each other, Lars might break this curse. He listed him as the 27th-best Tekken character, and found his role in his first game was positive and compared him favorably to Mortal Kombats newer protagonists at the time, like Shujinko or Taven, who he felt were less appealing. The reviewer had mixed feelings over Lars being able to escape the curse of the Mishima family, who are supposedly destined to fight each other. However, he thought teaming him up with Lee Chaolan, rather than fighting like their relatives, helped to expand Lee's popularity. A similar comment was made by 4thletter as while both Lars and Lee are not blood related brothers, they appear in Tekken 6 as allies, rather than enemies. Lars was also listed as the third best Tekken hero by Listas, as well as the 22nd best character in the franchise. VG247's reviewer enjoyed Lars' fights in Tekken 7s story mode against multiple armed guards despite how ridiculous he found it. IGN wrote that they found the transition between Lars and other characters in Tekken 7 story mode to be made easier on newcomers thanks to the game's option for simplified controls. RockPaperShotgun found Lars' relationship with Final Fantasy character Noctis hilarious and unbelievable.

Different types of merchandise with Lars' image have also been released, most notably a Tanahashi shirt which the wrestler wears during promotion of Tekken 7 in late 2017. In promoting Tekken 6, Namco released multiple posters featuring him. Anime News Network liked the alternate costume Kishimoto made for Lars, calling it "one of the more stylish Naruto super-ninja". Siliconera found it similar to that of the Akatsuki, the series' antagonists. Lars' addition to Naruto Shippuden: Ultimate Ninja Storm 2 has received mostly positive comments. Kotaku's Mike Fahey liked it, as it helped to expand the game's roster, but thought other characters from the Tekken series would be more suitable than Lars. A similar comment was made by a writer from GamesRadar, who found Lars' alternate design to resemble Naruto character Sasuke Uchiha, while suffering minor changes of his design that made him androgynous. Videogamer called it a "strange crossover," but noted that fighting games fans would appreciate his appearance in the game. Destructoid said that Tekken fans might be interested in playing Ultimate Ninja Storm 2 based on Lars' inclusion in the game. The Spanish developers of Storm 2 were surprised when learning that Lars would appear in the game of that as the announcement was made late during the game's development, noting that at the same time they reunited with Katsuhiro Harada a month earlier. Siliconera found him fitting for his lightning-powered hits.

Other writers have been more negative toward Lars. Jeff Gerstmann from GiantBomb considered his actions "pretty dull," and concluded that his inclusion in the leading role in the story mode was "sloppy" since, while players were able to choose any character to play with, Lars was always the one focused on during the fights. Lars was also listed by Destructoid as a runner-up for their worst haircuts in gaming. In the book The Language of Gaming, writer Astrid Ensslin commented that Lars had been criticized mostly by Western audiences because of the way his role in the Scenario Campaign mode is presented. GameSpy labeled Lars "Captain Ridiculous" owing to his "absurd" design, which they found resembled Michael Jackson. Nevertheless, they liked his gameplay mechanics, which made him a fast character, and allowed him to overpower his opponents. 1UP.com also praised Lars' moves, mentioning their balance between speed and strength. Both 1UP and IGN AU considered his appearance ridiculous, comparing him with Final Fantasy protagonists, despite his integral role in the story. Nevertheless, both of them praised his moves. Similarly, GameFocus called Lars a "dud" and a "Dragon Ball reject". VideoGamer.com called Lars "the emo," adding that his hairstyle and cape are "classic Tekken". Comic Book Resources noted the character's design and story divided the fans.

See also
List of Tekken characters

References

External links
 Lars' theme song "VREDE" on BatAAr's official YouTube channel
 Promotion of Lars' new costume from Tekken 7

Fictional characters with amnesia
Fictional commanders
Fictional military personnel in video games
Fictional Swedish people
Fictional martial artists in video games
Fictional Shorinji Kempo practitioners
Male characters in video games
Namco protagonists
Fictional soldiers in video games
Tekken characters
Video game characters with superhuman strength
Video game characters who can move at superhuman speeds
Video game characters introduced in 2008